Sailing was contested at the 1990 Asian Games in Qinhuangdao, China from September 23 to September 30.

Medalists

Men

Women

Open

Medal table

References 
 New Straits Times, October 1, 1990

External links 
 Olympic Council of Asia

 
1990 Asian Games events
1990
Asian Games
1990 Asian Games